Olga Velichko (born 20 November 1965) is a Russian foil fencer. She competed for the Unified Team at the 1992 Summer Olympics and for Russia at the 1996 Summer Olympics.

References

External links
 

1965 births
Living people
Russian female foil fencers
Olympic fencers of the Unified Team
Olympic fencers of Russia
Fencers at the 1992 Summer Olympics
Fencers at the 1996 Summer Olympics
20th-century Russian women